Bryan Keith Kelly (born February 24, 1959) is an American former professional baseball pitcher. He played during two seasons at the Major League Baseball (MLB) for the Detroit Tigers. He was drafted by the Tigers in the 6th round of the 1981 MLB draft. Kelly played his first professional season with their Class A Macon Peaches in 1981, and split his last season between Detroit, their Triple-A club, the Toledo Mud Hens, and the Seattle Mariners' Triple-A team, the Calgary Cannons, in 1987.

External links

1959 births
Living people
American expatriate baseball players in Canada
Baseball players from Maryland
Birmingham Barons players
Calgary Cannons players
Detroit Tigers players
Evansville Triplets players
Lakeland Tigers players
Macon Peaches players
Major League Baseball pitchers
Nashville Sounds players
People from Silver Spring, Maryland
Sportspeople from Montgomery County, Maryland
Toledo Mud Hens players
Valencia Matadors baseball players